The 22nd National Geographic Bee was held in Washington, D.C. on May 26, 2010, sponsored by the National Geographic Society. 13-year-old Aadith Moorthy of the state of Florida was the champion.

2010 state champions

References

2010 in Washington, D.C.
2010 in education
National Geographic Bee